Antu may refer to:

 Antu (goddess), a goddess, in Akkadian mythology
 Antu (Mapuche mythology), the Pillan spirit in the Mapuche mythology
 Antu, India, a town in Pratapgarh District, Uttar Pradesh, India
 Antu County, in Jilin, China
 Alpha-Naphthylthiourea, a thiourea derivative used as a rodenticide